Griffin-Bacal Advertising was a global advertising agency founded in 1978 by Tom Griffin and Joe Bacal. One of their first clients was Hasbro, which employed their services for coming up with advertising campaigns for several of their toy lines such as G.I. Joe: A Real American Hero and Transformers. At the company's peak, it was the 67th largest advertising company in the world.

In 1994, Griffin-Bacal was bought by DDB Worldwide, but Hasbro ceased employing their services in 2000. This resulted in Griffin-Bacal laying off two thirds of staff. Following these events and the retirement of Tom Griffin and Joe Bacal, DDB's parent company Omnicom decided to merge Griffin-Bacal with Moss/Dragoti in 2001.

Griffin-Bacal's co-founder Joe Bacal died in Manhattan, New York City, on October 24, 2019.

References 

American companies established in 1978
American companies disestablished in 2001
Advertising agencies of the United States
Marketing companies established in 1978
Companies based in New York City
1978 establishments in New York City
2001 disestablishments in New York (state)
1994 mergers and acquisitions